Hryhorii Kvitka-Osnovianenko (29 November 1778 – 20 August 1843) was a Ukrainian writer, journalist, and playwright. Founder of Ukrainian classicist prose. He was born in the vicinity of Kharkiv.

Life and work 
Hryhorii Kvitka-Osnovianenko was born in 1778 in the village of Osnova, near the city of Kharkiv, to a family of Ukrainian nobility. He adopted the pen name "Osnovianenko," a reference to the village of his birth, when he embarked on his literary career.

In 1812, Hryhorii Kvitka-Osnovianenko begins his social activities. He was appointed the director of a new regular lay theatre open in Kharkiv. Kvitka-Osnovianenko carried his love to theatre through all his life. Later this feeling made him write theatre drama works. In 1841, he wrote his marvellously interesting "Kharkiv Theatre History".

Kvitka-Osnovianenko was one of the earliest proponents of Ukrainian as a literary language and began publishing in the first Ukrainian literary journals printed in Kharkiv in the early 19th century. Like most of his contemporaries in the Ukrainian literary scene, he also wrote in Russian. He corresponded respectfully with Taras Shevchenko, keeping up constantly with literary life. He was a friend of Nikolai Gogol, and it is possible that Gogol's play The Government Inspector was inspired by Kvitka-Osnovianenko's satiric drama The Visitor from the Capitol or Turmoil in a District Town, which has a very similar plot and cast of characters.

His Ukrainian-language works were mostly burlesque and satirical in nature, but he also wrote more serious prose, such as his sentimental novella Marusia. He started Ukrainian classicist prose with the novella Marusia. According to his own statement about the novella, he wrote it "to prove to one unbeliever that something gentle and touching can be written in the Ukrainian language."

He also tried his hand at the gothic genre with his "Dead Man’s Easter" (1834).

Historical Novels 
From the historical works of interest are the “Historical and Statistical Outline of Slobozhanshchyna” (1838), “On the Sloboda Regiments”, “Ukrainians” (1841) and “History of the Theater in Kharkiv” (1841).

In the 1830s, Kvitka composed a fantastic lyrical story about the founding of the city of Kharkiv in the middle of the 17th century with his ancestor Andriy Kvitka. This story, published in his collected works, is not supported by any source and has never been seriously considered by any historian.

The most famous works 

 «Конотопська відьма» (The Witch of Konotop) (1833)
 «Маруся» (Marusia) (1832)
 «Салдацький патрет» (Soldier's Portrait) (1833)
 «Сватання на Гончарівці» (The Courtship at Honcharivka) (1835)
 «Пан Халявський» (Mr. Khalyavsky) (1839)
 «Сердешна Оксана» (Hearty Oksana) (1841)
 «Козир-дівка» (The Trump Girl) (1838)
 «Ганнуся» (Hannusya) (1839)
 «Шельменко-волосний писар» (Shelmenko-volost clerk) (1829)

Film adaptations 
Films based on his works:

 The Courtship at Goncharivka (1958)
 Shelmenko the Myrmidon (1910, 1911, 1957)
 Shelmenko the Myrmidon (1971)
 The Witch (1990, 2 a; based on the story "The Witch of Konotop")

Documentary films about Hryhorii Kvitka-Osnovianenko 

 "Hryhorii Kvitka-Osnovianenko" (1979)
 "Kvitka-Osnovianenko" (1988)

Critical reception 
Kvitka-Osnovianenko's literary achievement has tended to be a polarizing subject for critics of Ukrainian culture. On the one hand, as one of the first popular writers to use the Ukrainian language, he is viewed a founding figure of Ukrainian literature. On the other hand, many prominent Ukrainian scholars, including Ivan Franko, Mykola Zerov, and Dmytro Chyzhevsky, viewed his work as reactionary and conservative and were skeptical of the sentimental, pastoral image that he painted of Ukraine and Ukrainians.

References

Writers from Kharkiv
Ukrainian dramatists and playwrights
Ukrainian male short story writers
Ukrainian short story writers
Ukrainian novelists
Ukrainian journalists
Ukrainian writers in Russian
Ukrainian satirists

1778 births
1843 deaths